Richard Williams is an American basketball coach currently serving as the color commentator for Mississippi State University basketball.  He served as the head men's basketball coach at Mississippi State University from 1986 to 1998, compiling a record of 191–163. His 191 victories are the second most of any head coach in Mississippi State Bulldogs men's basketball program, history, bested only by his former assistant, Rick Stansbury. Williams's 1991 squad won the Southeastern Conference regular season championship and made the 1991 NCAA Division I men's basketball tournament for only the second time in school history, losing in the first round to Eastern Michigan. His 1995 squad made the Sweet Sixteen of the NCAA Tournament, and his 1996 squad made the school's only Final Four appearance, losing to Syracuse, 77–69. He received two SEC Coach of the Year awards. Williams resigned as the head coach at Mississippi State two years removed from his Final Four appearance.

After leaving Mississippi State, Williams coached the Memphis Houn'Dawgs of the American Basketball Association (ABA), the Jackson Rage of the World Basketball Association (WBA), and at his alma mater, Pearl High School in Pearl, Mississippi. He served as the director of basketball administration at the University of Alabama at Birmingham (UAB) in 2008 and in 2009 he was named the director of basketball administration and program coordinator for the Louisiana Tech Bulldogs basketball team on a volunteer basis. Williams was an assistant coach for Arkansas State under John Brady from 2010 to 2014. Williams served as the color commentator for the Mississippi State basketball team's radio broadcasts from the 2014–15 season through the 2019-2020 season.

Head coaching record

College

See also
 List of NCAA Division I Men's Final Four appearances by coach

References

Year of birth missing (living people)
Living people
American men's basketball coaches
Arkansas State Red Wolves men's basketball coaches
College men's basketball head coaches in the United States
Southern Miss Golden Eagles basketball coaches
High school basketball coaches in the United States
Junior college men's basketball coaches in the United States
Mississippi State Bulldogs men's basketball coaches
Mississippi State University alumni